Perrydale School is a K-12 public school near Amity, Oregon, United States. It is the only school in the Perrydale School District.

Academics
In 2013, 95% of the school's seniors received a diploma within 4 years.
In 2008, 90% of the school's seniors received their high school diploma. Of 20 students, 18 graduated and 2 dropped out.

Sports 
In 2004, the Perrydale football team won the Oregon State 1A football championship. In 2005, the softball team won the State Softball title. In 2018, the girls basketball team took 5th place at the state tournament.

References

High schools in Polk County, Oregon
Public middle schools in Oregon
Public high schools in Oregon
Public elementary schools in Oregon